Proteas Voulas is a Greek basketball club based in Voula, Attica. It was founded in 1980. Proteas has both men's and women's team which play in Greek national divisions. The women's team plays in A1 Ethniki Women (first-tier) and the men's team plays in Greek C Basketball League (fourth-tier). The team's colours are blue and red and the home stadium of the club is the Voulas Indoor Hall.

Women's team
Proteas Voulas has won a Greek cup, in season 2012-13. That year, the club played in A2 Ethniki, so Proteas became the first club in Greece which won a Greek cup whereas it was playing in lower division. At the same year, Proteas promoted to A1 Ethniki and since then it plays in first-tier of championship.

Roster

Men's team
Since 2015-16 season, the men's team of Proteas Voulas plays in Greek C Basketball League (fourth-tier).

Honours
Women's team
Greek Cup
Winner (1): 2012-13

References

External links
Official Page

Basketball teams in Greece
Basketball teams in Attica